Henry Fork is an unincorporated community and census-designated place (CDP) in Franklin County, Virginia, United States, just south of Rocky Mount. The population as of the 2010 census was 1,234.

Geography
US 220 leads north  to Roanoke and south  to Martinsville.

The Pigg River, an east-flowing tributary of the Roanoke River, forms the northern edge of the CDP and its border with Rocky Mount.

References

Census-designated places in Franklin County, Virginia
Census-designated places in Virginia